Juliana Jocelyn Azumah-Mensah (born 15 June 1950) is a Ghanaian politician and nurse. She was the Minister for Women and Children's Affairs. She is also the Member of Parliament for Ho East constituency.

Early life and education
Juliana Azumah-Mensah was born at Koforidua, capital of the Eastern Region of Ghana. Between 1956 and 1964, she attended the Roman Catholic Primary and Local Authority Middle Schools at Agortime-Kpetoe in the Volta Region. She had her secondary education at OLA Girls Senior High School (Ho) at Ho, capital of the Volta Region, where she obtained the GCE Ordinary Level in 1969.

She proceeded to the United Kingdom where she trained at the Ipswich East Anglia School of Nursing at Ipswich, Suffolk. She qualified in August 1973 as a State Registered Nurse. A year later, she trained in Midwifery at Saint Peter's Hospital at Chertsey in Surrey, graduating in August 1975 as a State Certified Midwife.

She enrolled at the University of Birmingham for postgraduate studies, leading to her obtaining an MSc in Health Management and Administration in October 1997.

Career
Azumah-Mensah started work as a clerical officer at the Ministry of Finance and Economic Planning in 1969. She left for further studies in the UK after a year. She then worked as a nurse and midwife at various hospitals in the UK.

She moved to Saudi Arabia, where she worked at the King Abdulaziz University Hospital between 1978 and 1984. She returned to the UK, working at the Mayday University Hospital between 1984 and 1987.

She returned to Ghana in 1988 and worked for two years as the Principal Nurse in the Ho Diocese. Between 2001 and 2005, she worked with the Catholic Health Services. She was stationed at Ho, where she served as the Executive Secretary/Director of Health Services of the Ho Diocese and the Regional Co-ordinating Director.

Politics
Juliana Azumah-Mensah was first elected Member of Parliament for the Ho East Constituency on the ticket of the National Democratic Congress (NDC) in the 2004 parliamentary election and took her seat in January 2005. She retained her seat in the 2008 election.

She was first appointed by President John Atta Mills as Minister for Tourism in 2009. She was shifted to Minister for Women and Children's Affairs in January 2010, until 2012.

Personal life
She is married with two children. She hails from Agortime-Kpetoe in the Volta Region of Ghana.

See also 
List of Mills government ministers
Ho East (Ghana parliament constituency)

References

External links and sources
Juliana Azumah-Nelson on Ghana Parliament website
Profile on Ghana government website
Profile on GhanaDistricts.com

1950 births
Living people
Ghanaian MPs 2005–2009
Ghanaian MPs 2009–2013
Ghanaian MPs 2013–2017
Ghanaian nurses
People from Koforidua
National Democratic Congress (Ghana) politicians
Alumni of the University of Birmingham
21st-century Ghanaian women politicians
Women government ministers of Ghana
Women members of the Parliament of Ghana
OLA Girls Senior High School (Ho) alumni
Tourism ministers of Ghana
Women's ministers of Ghana